Jawahar Navodaya Vidyalaya, Bankura or JNV Bankura is a boarding, co-educational  school in Bankura district of West Bengal in India. Navodaya Vidyalayas are funded by the Indian Ministry of Human Resources Development.

History 
The school was founded in 2005 and is a part of Jawahar Navodaya Vidyalaya schools. This school is administered and monitored by Patna regional office of Navodaya Vidyalaya Smiti.

Affiliations 
JNV Bankura is affiliated to Central Board of Secondary Education with affiliation number 2440010.

See also
 List of JNV schools

References

External links
Official Website of JNV Bankura

Boarding schools in West Bengal
High schools and secondary schools in West Bengal
Bankura
Schools in Bankura district
Educational institutions established in 2005
2005 establishments in West Bengal